The Liga ACB, known as Liga Endesa for sponsorship reasons, is the top professional basketball division of the Spanish basketball league system. Administrated by the Asociación de Clubs de Baloncesto (ACB), Liga ACB is contested by 18 teams, with the two lowest-placed teams relegated to the LEB Oro and replaced by the top team in that division plus the winner of the promotion playoffs.

The competition was founded as the ACB Primera División on 1983 following the decision of clubs in the Liga Nacional, founded in 1957, to break away from the Spanish Basketball Federation and professionalize the league. The league's accumulated revenues were worth around €30 million in 2020, with Endesa and Movistar Plus+ contributing 50% of the revenues of the league. The league is a corporation where president Antonio Martín is responsible for its management, whilst the member clubs act as shareholders. Clubs were apportioned central payment revenues of €12 million in 2019–20.

A total of 49 teams have competed in Liga ACB since its inception in 1983. Seven teams have been crowned champions, with FC Barcelona winning the title a record 16 times and Real Madrid 14 times, though Liga ACB also saw other champions, including Baskonia, Joventut Badalona, Bàsquet Manresa, Baloncesto Málaga and Valencia Basket.

Liga ACB is one of the most popular professional indoor sports leagues in the world, with an average attendance of 6,236 for league matches in the 2018–19 season. This is the ninth-highest of any domestic professional indoor sports league in the world and the fourth-highest of any professional basketball league in the world, behind the National Basketball Association, the EuroLeague, and the Women's National Basketball Association.

Competition format

The competition format follows the usual double round-robin format. During the course of a season, which lasts from October to May, each club plays every other club twice, once at home and once away, for a total of 34 games. Teams are ranked by total wins, with the eight highest-ranked clubs at the end of the season plays the playoffs and the winner of the playoffs is crowned champion.

Relegation and promotion
A system of relegation and promotion exists between the Liga ACB and the LEB Oro. The two lowest placed teams in Liga ACB are relegated to the LEB Oro, and the top team from the LEB Oro promoted to Liga ACB, with an additional club promoted after a series of playoffs involving the second, third, fourth, fifth, sixth, seventh, eighth and ninth placed clubs. Below is a complete record of how many teams played in each season throughout the league's history:

Controversies about promotion to Liga ACB

Until 2012, in the 29 editions played of the Liga ACB, only three teams declined promotion, due to acting as reserve teams or for lack of funds: CB Guadalajara and CB Cornellà in 1993 and CB Cajabilbao in 1994.

Since 2012, due to the financial crisis that started in 2008, only two teams (Canarias and Andorra) of a possible 10 could promote to Liga ACB. This started a discussion about the promotion requirements of the ACB, considered by the LEB Oro clubs as "disproportionate".

For clubs that promote and would make their debut in the ACB demands:
 An arena with a minimum capacity of 5,000 seats.
 An inbound of €3m. For clubs that return to the league after a promotion, an update of the inbound is demanded.
 A deposit of €1.7m that would be returned in case of relegation to LEB Oro. In case of a new promotion, this deposit is required to be restored.
 Conversion into a Sociedad Anónima Deportiva if the club remains in Liga ACB after its first season.

In 2012, Iberostar Canarias and Menorca Bàsquet achieved promotion to ACB, but neither could fulfill the requirements in order to promote. However, Canarias finally played in ACB after buying the berth in the league of Lucentum Alicante, previously sold to the association.

In 2013, neither CB Atapuerca, Ford Burgos by sponsorship reasons, nor Lucentum Alicante could promote. The latter resigned also to play in the second league and joined the fifth division.

In 2014 and 2015, CB Tizona, also Ford Burgos by sponsorship reasons, did not promote despite achieving the place two years in a row. After its second failed promotion, the third in the city of Burgos, the club sued the Association any accused them of "distorting the reality". Also in 2015, despite having played in the league during the 1980s and 1990s, Club Ourense Baloncesto was not admitted in the league despite fulfilling all the requirements, after not passing an accounts audit. However, ACB would admit Ourense for the 2016–17 season if it fulfilled the requirements regardless of their position in the 2015–16 LEB Oro season.

On 24 April 2016, the National Commission of the Markets and the Competence argued that the inbound impedes, in an "unjustified, disproportionate and discriminatory" way, access of new clubs to Liga ACB.

In June 2016, the two promoted teams from LEB Oro (Palencia and Melilla) resigned promotion to the 2016–17 ACB season and requested to the ACB their sign-in before the 2017–18 season. However, as Gipuzkoa Basket, who finished in relegation positions in three of the last four seasons, resigned from ACB, the Association offered again its place to Palencia and Melilla under these conditions:
 An arena with a minimum capacity of 5,000 seats.
 An inbound of €2m. The second million delayed on the dates agreed between the club and ACB.
 A deposit of €1,6m that would be returned in case of relegation to LEB Oro. In case of a new promotion, this deposit is required to be restored.
 Conversion into a Sociedad Anónima Deportiva before the start of their second season in Liga ACB.

Palencia and Mellila refused the invitation, to reinforce their position against the inbound to play in the league.

In April 2017, the National Commission for Markets and Competition declared the entering inbound and the deposit for the regulation of promotions and relegations as illegal, as they consider it "unjustified, discriminatory and excessive" and imposed a fine of €400,000 to the ACB. Subsequently, the ACB replied that it would appeal the decision of the CNMC, contending that it infringed on the self-organizing capacity of professional leagues, as recognized in the Treaty on the Functioning of the European Union and in the European jurisprudence, and which was unprecedented in Europe and in the rest of the world.

In May 2017, the ACB ratified to file a contentious-administrative appeal and request for precautionary measures before the National Court, on the occasion of the resolution of the National Commission for Markets and Competition (CNMC), as well as to refuse any resolution or decision, present or future, which relates to that act. Also, the ACB approved to establish a negotiation plan with the CSD and the FEB regarding the number of participating teams and the conditions to access to the competition in the next seasons.

In June 2017, the ACB agreed not to require the promotion requirements that have been the subject of the resolution (entering inbound and the deposit for the regulation of promotions and relegations) and the participation fee. Also, the ACB agreed to continue negotiations with the CSD, the FEB and the CNMC to try to establish by mutual agreement new conditions for promotion. In view of the possibility of reaching an agreement that establishes economic and financial requirements in a consensual way before July 5, the Assembly has agreed to establish two new access criteria, provided that there is no pronouncement of the National Court on the precautionary measures regarding the resolution of the National Court, nor agreement with the different bodies that replace it. These conditions were:
 A deposit of €1.9m that would be returned in case of relegation to LEB Oro, guaranteeing at least the value contributed by the clubs in their moment of promotion.
 A minimum budget (for all clubs) of €2.3m to play in the league.

On 10 July 2017, the ACB ratified the agreement with the FEB endorsed by the CSD, to change the conditions to make them easier for promoted teams from LEB Oro. The ACB had also reached a principle of agreement with FEB and CSD regarding a reduction of competition to 16 clubs in 2019 and the model of promotions and relegations in the coming seasons. However, this text has not obtained the necessary support of the clubs in the General Assembly and has not been approved, agreeing to continue the negotiations to find the model of competition appropriate to the interests of the teams overall. These new conditions consist of:
 A deposit of €1.6 million, to pay in four season, that would be returned in case of relegation to LEB Oro, guaranteeing at least the value contributed by the clubs in their moment of promotion.
 A minimum budget (for all clubs) of €2 million to play in the league.

Ten days later and two years after the denounce of CB Tizona, Gipuzkoa Basket and CB Miraflores, also from Burgos, were promoted to Liga ACB. These were the first promotions since the one of Andorra in 2014. Also, Miraflores became the first team to make its debut in ACB since 2009.

Ranking of clubs on equal wins
If wins are equal between two or more clubs, the rules are:

 If all clubs involved have played each other twice:
 If the tie is between two clubs, then the tie is broken using the point difference for the two matches those clubs have played against each other
 If the tie is between more than two clubs, then the tie is broken using the games the clubs have played against each other:
 a) head-to-head wins
 b) head-to-head point difference
 c) head-to-head points scored
 If two legged games between all clubs involved have not been played, or the tie is not broken by the rules above, it is broken using:
 a) total point difference
 b) total points scored
 If the tie is still not broken, a new tiebreak process is initiated with only those teams that remain tied.

Qualifying for European competitions
The top teams in Liga ACB, apart from EuroLeague clubs, qualify for the EuroCup and the Champions League with no preference for any competition. Three teams have guaranteed spots in the EuroCup and four teams have guaranteed spots in the Champions League. In addition, other clubs could participate in the FIBA Europe Cup.

History 
The first basketball league in Spain was the Liga Nacional, organised by the Spanish Basketball Federation, whose first edition was played in 1957 by six teams from Madrid and the province of Barcelona. Until 1983 it continued being organised by the federation and consisting in only a round-robin tournament, where every teams faced all other twice, one at home and one away, with two points per win and one point in case of a draw.

In 1982, the Asociación de Clubs de Baloncesto was founded and one year later took the helm of the organisation of the league, with several changes in the competition format as they introduced the playoffs and the overtimes in case of draw.

League names 
 1983–1988: ACB Primera División
 1988–2011: Liga ACB
 2011–present Liga Endesa

Champions

Titles by club

Current clubs

All-time Liga ACB table 
The all-time Liga ACB table is an overall record of all match results of every team that has played in Liga ACB since the 1983–84 season. The table is accurate as of the end of the 2021–22 season.

League or status at 2021–22 season:

Awards 
 ACB Most Valuable Player Award
 ACB Finals Most Valuable Player Award
 ACB Best Young Player Award
 All-ACB Team
 ACB Player of the Month Award
 ACB Best Coach
 AEEB Coach of the Year
 ACB contests

Statistical leaders

All-time scoring leaders
Player nationality set by the player's national team affiliation. In bold, active players. In gold, players with more than 6,000 points, considered by the ACB as historic players.

Stats through end of 2018–19 ACB season:

All-time rebounding leaders
Player nationality set by the player's national team affiliation. In bold, active players. In gold, players with more than 2,500 rebounds, considered by the ACB as historic players.

Stats through the end of the 2018–19 ACB season:

Records 

These are the standing ACB records for the regular season (RS) and play-offs (PO).

 Most Points in a game
 RS: 54 by Epi, FC Barcelona vs Joventut Massana on 18 February 1984
 PO: 43 by David Russell, CB Estudiantes vs Real Madrid on 28 March 1987
 Liga Nacional (prior to the 1983–84 season): 65 by Walter Szczerbiak, Real Madrid vs Dyc Breogán on 8 February 1976

 Most Field Goals Made in a game
 RS: 25 by Essie Hollis, Arabatxo Baskonia vs OAR Ferrol on 5 February 1984
 PO: 19 by Chicho Sibilio, FC Barcelona vs OAR Ferrol on 17 March 1984

 Most Three Point Field Goals Made in a game
 RS: 12 by Jacob Pullen, FC Barcelona vs CB Valladolid on 8 March 2014
 PO: 10 by Chicho Sibilio, FC Barcelona vs Breogán Caixa Galicia on 12 April 1986

 Most Free Throws Made in a game
 RS: 29 by Jeff Lamp, Granada vs Fórum Filatélico Valladolid on 21 December 1991
 PO: 19 by José Miguel Antúnez, Estudiantes Caja Postal vs CAI Zaragoza on 19 April 1991

 Most Rebounds in a game
 RS: 29 by Clarence Kea, Juver Murcia vs Dyc Breogán on 21 December 1991
 PO: 21 by Fernando Romay, Real Madrid vs FC Barcelona on 4 April 1987; and by Arvydas Sabonis, Real Madrid Teka vs Valvi Girona on 1 April 1993 & Real Madrid Teka vs Estudiantes Caja Postal on 1 May 1993

 Most Assists in a game
 RS: 19 by Sergio Rodríguez, Real Madrid vs Montakit Fuenlabrada on 11 May 2016
 PO: 13 by Michael Anderson, Caja San Fernando vs TDK Manresa on 22 May 1999; by Andre Turner, Caja San Fernando vs Real Madrid Teka on 7 May 1999; and by Elmer Bennett, TAU Cerámica vs Adecco Estudiantes on 20 May 2001

 Most Steals in a game
 RS: 13 by Lance Berwald, BBV Villalba vs Caja Guipúzcoa on 11 March 1989 (unofficial)
 PO: 14 by Andrés Jiménez, Ron Negrita Joventut vs Real Madrid on 1 May 1985

 Most Blocks in a game
 RS: 12 by Fran Vázquez, FC Barcelona vs Grupo Capitol Valladolid on 7 January 2007
 PO: 8 by George Singleton, TDK Manresa vs Unicaja Polti on 7 April 1994; and by Derrick Alston, TDK Manresa vs Adecco Estudiantes on 8 May 1998

 PER
 RS: 66 by Arvydas Sabonis, Real Madrid vs Coren Ourense on 31 March 1995
 PO: 48 by Dennis Hopson, Banco Natwest Zaragoza vs Marbella Joventut on 18 April 1993

 Prolific Scorers
 Most 50 points RS games in a career: 2 by Eddie Phillips and Henry Turner.
 Most 50 points RS games in a season: 2 by Eddie Phillips in 1986/87 and Henry Turner in 1991/92.

 Most 40 points RS games in a career: 11 by Ray Smith.
 Most 40 points RS games in a season: 7 by Eddie Phillips in 1986/87 and Ray Smith in 1988/89.
 Most 40 points RS games streak: 3 by Eddie Phillips in 1986/87 and Oscar Schmidt in 1993/94.

 Most 30 points RS games in a season: 24 by Walter Berry in 1990/91.
 Most 30 points RS games streak: 13 by Walter Berry in 1990/91 (from stage 4 to stage 16).

 Players with 20 rebounds games
 12 games: Arvydas Sabonis (9 RS, 3 PO).
 4 games: Jerome Lane (4 RS)
 3 games: Tanoka Beard (3 RS) and Ken Johnson (3 RS).
 2 games: Clarence Kea (2 RS), Warren Kidd (2 RS), Terry White (2 RS) and Claude Riley (2 RS).
 1 game: Fernando Romay (1 PO), Felipe Reyes (1 RS), Granger Hall (1 RS), Clyde Myers (1 RS) and Greg Foster (1 PO).

 Double-Doubles (d-d)
 All-time RS: 205 by Granger Hall in 387 games, 137 by Arvydas Sabonis in 189 games, 119 by Claude Riley in 278 games, 116 by Larry Micheaux in 235 games, 100 by Tanoka Beard in 168 games
 All-time PO: 37 by Arvydas Sabonis in 46 games, 22 by Granger Hall in 46 games, 20 by Larry Micheaux in 33 games
 Most d-d in a single RS: 33 by Tanoka Beard, 1997–98 
 Most d-d in a single PO: 11 by Arvydas Sabonis, 1992–93 & 1993–94 
 RS games streak recording a d-d: 17 by Arvydas Sabonis, 1989–90

 Triple-Doubles
 Luka Dončić with 17 points, 10 rebounds and 10 assists on 9 May 2018
 Fran Vázquez with 11 points, 10 rebounds and 12 blocks on 7 January 2007
 Dejan Tomašević with 14 points, 13 rebounds and 10 assists, Pamesa Valencia vs Unicaja on 12 May 2004
 George Singleton with 23 points, 12 rebounds and 10 blocks on 12 February 1994
 Nacho Suárez with 10 points, 10 rebounds and 11 assists on stage 13 1990–91; and 15 points, 10 rebounds and 11 assists on stage 19 1990–91
 Mike Smith with 31 points, 10 rebounds and 10 steals on 21 October 1989
 Most Points in a game
 RS: 147 – FC Barcelona defeated Cajabilbao 147–106 on 31 January 1987

 Fewest Points in a game
 RS: 39 – Lagun Aro GBC was defeated by Blancos de Rueda Valladolid 61–39 on 25 April 2010

 Largest Margin of Victory in a game
 RS: 65 – FC Barcelona Lassa defeated Real Betis Energía Plus 121–56 on 11 April 2018

 Victory with fewest points
 RS: 49 – Assignia Manresa defeated Meridiano Alicante 49–48 on 6 March 2011

Attendances
Since several years ago, the Liga ACB is the European domestic league with the highest average attendance, always surpassing the 6,000 spectators per game since the 2002–03 season.

Season averages
All averages include playoffs games.

Source:

Historic average attendances
All averages include playoffs games.

Source:

Individual game highest attendance

Source:

Other competitions 
 Spanish King's Cup
 Spanish Supercup

Notes

References

External links 

 Liga ACB official website 
 Liga ACB on Eurobasket.com

 

 
1
Spain
1983 establishments in Spain
Sports leagues established in 1983
Professional sports leagues in Spain